Princess Michael may refer to:

Princess Anne of Bourbon-Parma (1948–2016), wife of Michael I of Romania
Júlia Hunyady de Kéthely (1831–1919), wife of Prince Mihailo Obrenović
Baroness Marie Christine von Reibnitz (born 1945), wife of Prince Michael of Kent
Marina Karella (born 1940), wife of Prince Michael of Greece and Denmark